Parliamentary elections were held in Equatorial Guinea on 16 December 1973. The new constitution approved in a referendum the same year provided for a 60-seat People's National Assembly. The United National Workers' Party (PUNT) was the sole legal party at the time, as the 1973 constitution had made the country a one-party state. The PUNT presented a single list of 60 candidates for the 60 seats, which was approved by voters.

Results

References

Equatorial Guinea
Elections in Equatorial Guinea
1973 in Equatorial Guinea
One-party elections
Single-candidate elections
Election and referendum articles with incomplete results